Paul Allen Simmons (August 31, 1921 – October 9, 2014) was a United States district judge of the United States District Court for the Western District of Pennsylvania.

Education and career

Born in Monongahela, Pennsylvania, Simmons received a Bachelor of Arts degree from the University of Pittsburgh in 1946 and a Juris Doctor from Harvard Law School in 1949. He was a professor at the South Carolina State University School of Law in Orangeburg, South Carolina from 1949 to 1952. He was a professor at the North Carolina Central University School of Law in Durham, North Carolina from 1952 to 1956. He was in private practice in Monongahela from 1956 to 1973. He was a judge of the Washington County Court of Common Pleas in Pennsylvania from 1973 to 1978.

Federal judicial service

Simmons was nominated by President Jimmy Carter on January 26, 1978, to a seat on the United States District Court for the Western District of Pennsylvania vacated by Judge Ralph Francis Scalera. He was confirmed by the United States Senate on April 6, 1978, and received his commission on April 7, 1978. He assumed senior status on June 1, 1990. He died on October 9, 2014 in Monongahela.

See also 
 List of African-American federal judges
 List of African-American jurists
 List of first minority male lawyers and judges in Pennsylvania

References

Sources
 

1921 births
2014 deaths
People from Monongahela, Pennsylvania
University of Pittsburgh alumni
Harvard Law School alumni
African-American judges
Judges of the Pennsylvania Courts of Common Pleas
Judges of the United States District Court for the Western District of Pennsylvania
United States district court judges appointed by Jimmy Carter
20th-century American judges